Lennar Corporation is a home construction company based in the census-designated place of Fontainebleau, Florida, with a Miami postal address. In 2021, the company was the second-largest home construction company in the United States based on the number of homes sold. In 2021, the company was ranked 129th on the Fortune 500. The company operates in Florida, Arizona, California, Colorado, Delaware, Georgia, Idaho, Illinois, Indiana, Maryland, Minnesota, Nevada, New Jersey, North Carolina, Oregon, Pennsylvania, South Carolina, Tennessee, Texas, Utah, Virginia, Washington, West Virginia, and Wisconsin. It also has investments in multifamily and single family residential rental properties and investments in property technology companies. The name Lennar is a portmanteau of the first names of two of the company's founders, Leonard Miller and Arnold Rosen.

History

Early history
The company dates back to F&R Builders, a company founded in 1954 by Gene Fisher and real estate developer Arnold P. Rosen. In 1956, Leonard Miller (who later became the namesake of the Leonard M. Miller School of Medicine at the University of Miami), a 23-year-old entrepreneur that owned 42 lots in Miami-Dade County, Florida, invested $10,000 and partnered with the company.

In 1969, the company reached an equity base of $1 million, and by 1971, Miller and Rosen changed the name to Lennar Corporation. That year the firm became a public company via an initial public offering, raising $8.7 million. It was listed on the New York Stock Exchange in 1972.

In 1973, the company acquired Mastercraft Homes, based in Phoenix, Arizona, for approximately $2 million, as well as the Womack Development Company. Shortly thereafter, the company established operations in the midwestern United States by purchasing Bert L. Smokler & Company, based in Detroit, Michigan, and Dreyfus Interstate Development Corp., based in Minneapolis-St. Paul, Minnesota.

In 1984, the company acquired H. Miller & Sons for $24 million.

In January 1989, the company acquired Richmond American Homes of Florida for $18 million.

In February 1992, the company acquired Amerifirst's $1 billion real estate portfolio in a joint venture with Morgan Stanley.

In October 1992, following Hurricane Andrew, the company faced several lawsuits from homeowners alleging careless building quality.

In July 1993, the company formed a joint venture with Westinghouse Electric Corporation and  Lehman Brothers to acquire a $2 billion face-value loan portfolio from Westinghouse Electric Corporation for $1.1 billion.

In 1995, the company acquired Friendswood Development Company from Exxon, and acquired California company Bramalea.

In 1996, the company acquired Winncrest Homes. The company also acquired  acres in and took over management of Coto de Caza, California, a census-designated place and a gated community, from Chevron Corporation.

In 1997, Stuart Miller, the son of co-founder Leonard Miller, became CEO of the company. Leonard Miller died in 2002.

In 1997, the company acquired West Venture Homes. In 2002, the company merged with Pacific Greystone, and acquired Theyst Venture Homes, 2700 homes in the North Natomas Community, and 800 San Diego homesites. In 1998, the company acquired North American Title Company, Winncrest Homes, Polygon, and ColRich Communities. The company also acquired 3 closely held home construction companies operating in California for $370 million. The following year the company acquired Eagle Home Mortgage and Souththeyst Land Title.

2000-present
In 2000, the company acquired U.S. Home Corporation for $476 million in cash and stock, which resulted in the company doubling in size.

In 2001, the company acquired home building operations from Fortress Investment Group.

In 2002, the company acquired Patriot Homes based in Columbia, Maryland, Barry Andrews Homes in Baltimore, Maryland, as well as Don Galloway Homes, The Genesee Company, Cambridge Homes, and Sunstar Communities. It also acquired Concord Homes and Summit Homes, both based in Chicago. The company then acquired  on Mare Island, in a closed Navy base, for redevelopment.

In 2003, Lennar acquired Coleman Homes.

In 2004, the company acquired Newhall Land and Farming Company for $990 million. The company also acquired the assets of Queens Properties for $33.8 million, in addition to Connel-Barron Homes and Classic American Homes.

In 2005, Lennar acquired Barker Coleman Homes, and the company acquired the 3,718-acre Marine Corps Air Station El Toro for redevelopment.

In 2006, Lennar spun off its commercial servicing division, LNR Property Corporation, which was acquired by Starwood Capital Group in 2012.

In November 2006, Lennar chairman Robert J. Strudler died.

In December 2007, during the subprime mortgage crisis, the company sold an 80% interest in 11,000 properties for 40% of their previously stated book value to Morgan Stanley.

In 2007, Lennar founded Rialto Capital Management, which was originated to acquire distressed real estate and mortgage debt. 

In 2008–2009, former businessman and convicted felon Barry Minkow engaged in an extortion scheme, spreading false information about the company that resulted in its stock price falling 26% in one day. Minkow was sentenced to 5 years in prison and was ordered to pay $584 million in restitution. San Diego real estate developer Nicolas Marsch III hired Minkow to back his claims that Lennar cheated Marsch out of millions of dollars on a private golf community. After a trial, a Superior Court judge decided in July 2010 that Marsch actually owed Lennar $17 million for the development. A subsequent civil suit filed by Lennar against Marsch resulted in a $1 billion judgement in December 2013 for Lennar, $802 million in damages and $200 million in punitive damages.

In February 2017, the company acquired WCI Communities, which operated in Florida, for $643 million.

In February 2018, the company acquired CalAtlantic Homes.

References

External links

1954 establishments in Florida
1970s initial public offerings
American companies established in 1954
Companies based in Miami
Companies listed on the New York Stock Exchange
Construction and civil engineering companies established in 1954
Construction and civil engineering companies of the United States
Home builders
Real estate companies established in 1954
Real estate companies of the United States